The Burmese zodiac is the traditional Burmese system of astronomy and astrology. While it is still an important component of the Burmese calendar, today, the zodiac is closely identified with Burmese astrology, called Bedin. Largely derived from Hindu astronomy and Vedic astrology, the Burmese zodiac consists of not only the same 12 signs of the Western zodiac but also 27 lunar mansions of the month and eight weekday signs.

Structure

Seasons
The Burmese zodiac, like the Western zodiac, is divided into 12 signs called yathi. The Burmese signs are identical to Indian and Western signs as they were derived from Indian and ultimately Western zodiac. Each yathi is divided into 30 degrees; each degree into 60 minutes; and each minute into 60 seconds.

Lunar mansions
The zodiac month consists of 27 days, approximating the mean sidereal month of 27.321661 days. Thus each zodiac day, called nekkhat, represents a lunar mansion, or a segment of the ecliptic along which the moon revolves around the earth. Though the names are Burmese adaptations of Sanskrit names, the Burmese system is not the same as the modern Indian system. The Burmese system uses unequal spaces for each segment (from 5° to 26°), and the first segment, Athawani, begins at 350° longitude. The modern Indian system uses equal segments of 13° 20' (360° divided by 27), and the first segment, Asvini, begins at 0°. (The zodiac also recognizes a lost 28th constellation, called Abizi (Sanskrit: Abhijit), which apparently made one revolution among these stars in 27 to 28 days.)

The nekkhats are usually used to calculate the zata (horoscope) of a person or an event. Many historical dates were represented with the nekkhat position, not with the more common calendrical date.

Weekdays

The Burmese zodiac employs eight signs in a seven-day week, with each sign representing its own day, cardinal direction, planet (celestial body) and animal; it is known as the "Mahabote zodiac". The zodiacs, with slight variations, are also found in Sri Lanka and Thailand.

While the eight signs are the most prevalent in modern Burmese zodiac, the zodiac officially also recognizes a ninth sign called Ketu, which rules over all of the signs. The same sign also appears in Sri Lanka and Thailand under the same name. Ketu's sign is a mythical Animal of Five Beauties called pyinsarupa with the antlers of a deer, the tusks and the trunk of an elephant, the mane of a lion, the body of a naga serpent, and the tail of a fish. Moreover, Rahu and Ketu, while borrowed from Hindu astrology, are different from their original versions. Hindu astrology considers Rahu and Ketu to be the ascending and descending lunar nodes but Burmese astrology considers them distinct planets.

At any rate, the inclusion of Ketu is not due to astronomical necessity but rather cultural. (J.C. Eade points out that "there is no astronomical necessity" for Ketu, whose orbit can be derived from the value of Rahu, and suggests that Ketu was "superfluous to the system, and perhaps even as an entity that owes its origin to a mistake". Htin Aung says the use of Rahu and Ketu in Burmese zodiac and astrology is for cultural, not necessarily astronomical, value, noting that the nine signs neatly fit the Nine Gods of Burmese animist tradition and indeed are an essential part of the "Ceremony of the Nine Gods" usually held when there is sickness in the house.)

The signs can be represented in a nine-square diagram. The exact arrangement is used to place the planetary figurines in the "Ceremony of the Nine Gods", with Ketu in the center, right behind a statue of the Buddha. All the planetary figures face the Buddha (as the animist practice has been absorbed into Burmese Buddhism).

The Sunday, Tuesday, Saturday and Rahu planets are considered to be Malefics, or planets with an evil influence while the Monday, Wednesday, Thursday and Friday planets are considered Benefics, or planets with benign influence. Ketu is considered to be the most powerful and a Benefic but as the chief planet, it cannot be grouped with any other planet. However, modern Burmese astrology rarely uses Ketu, and tends to use only the other eight planets.

See also
 Burmese calendar#Cycle
 Burmese culture

Notes

References

Bibliography
 
 
 
 
 

Astrology by tradition
Zodiac